Systematic may refer to:

Science 
 Short for systematic error
 Systematic fault
 Systematic bias, errors that are not determined by chance but are introduced by an inaccuracy (involving either the observation or measurement process) inherent to the system
 Something related to systematics or taxonomy, sub-discipline of biology

Economy 
 Systematic trading (also known as mechanical trading) is a way of defining trade goals, risk controls and rules that can make investment and trading decisions in a methodical way
 Systematic Paris-Region: French business cluster devoted to complex systems

Music 
 Systematic (band): American hard rock band
 Systematic Chaos: ninth studio album by American progressive metal band Dream Theater

See also 
 Systematics (disambiguation)
 Systemic (disambiguation)